Jonas Bahamboula Mbemba, nicknamed Tostao (born 2 February 1949), is a former Congolese international football winger.

Career
Born in Brazzaville, Bahamboula spent his entire career playing club football for local side Diables Noirs.

With the Congo national football team, Bahamboula won the 1972 African Cup of Nations. He also played at the 1974 and 1978 African Cup of Nations finals.

In 2006, he was selected by CAF as one of the best 200 African football players of the last 50 years.

References

External links 
Profile at RFI.fr

1949 births
Living people
Africa Cup of Nations-winning players
Sportspeople from Brazzaville
Republic of the Congo footballers
Republic of the Congo international footballers
1972 African Cup of Nations players
1974 African Cup of Nations players
1978 African Cup of Nations players
CSMD Diables Noirs players
Association football wingers